Orzechowo  is a village in the administrative district of Gmina Wąbrzeźno, within Wąbrzeźno County, Kuyavian-Pomeranian Voivodeship, in north-central Poland.

Churches
Churche in Orzechowo is dedicated to Saint Mary Magdalene.

Notable residents
 Hans Baasner (1916–1983), Luftwaffe pilot

References

Orzechowo